The West Indies Women T20 Tri-Series was a Women's Twenty20 International series which took place in Barbados in 2013. England, New Zealand and the West Indies competed in a double round-robin group stage, with England and the West Indies progressing to the final. The West Indies then won the tournament, beating England in the final by 8 wickets. The tournament followed New Zealand's tour of the West Indies and preceded England's tour of the West Indies.

Squads

Points table

 advanced to the Final

Fixtures

1st ODI

2nd ODI

3rd ODI

4th ODI

5th ODI

6th ODI

Final

See also
 New Zealand women's cricket team in the West Indies in 2013–14
 English women's cricket team in the West Indies in 2013–14

References

External links
West Indies Tri-Nation Twenty20 Women's Series 2013/14 at ESPN Cricinfo

International cricket competitions in 2013
2013 in women's cricket
Women's international cricket tours of the West Indies
England women's cricket team tours
New Zealand women's national cricket team tours
Women's Twenty20 cricket international competitions